Thomas John Williams  (9 May 1889 – 4 July 1956) was Archdeacon of Craven from 1949 to 1956.

Educated at Durham University and ordained in 1915, Williams was awarded the Military Cross for his service as a Chaplain to the Forces during World War I. He was Vicar of Otley from 1937; and an Honorary Canon of Bradford Cathedral from 1939.

References

Archdeacons of Craven
World War I chaplains
Royal Army Chaplains' Department officers
1889 births
1956 deaths
Alumni of Durham University
Recipients of the Military Cross